Poteau is a city in, and county seat of, Le Flore County, Oklahoma, United States.  The population was 8,520 as of the 2010 census.

History
In 1719, Bernard de la Harpe led a group of French explorers through this area and gave the river its present name. The present day city was founded in 1885, its name derived from the nearby Poteau River. During the late 1700s, there was a large French outpost at Belle Point (Ft. Smith). From there, they would travel up the Poteau River to a secondary post at the base of Cavanal Mountain. Because of this, the river was named the "Post River", or Poteau River, and the outpost was simply called the post, or "Poteau". A group of French explorers gave the river its present name during the early 18th Century. Poteau is a French word meaning post.

The Poteau Chamber of Commerce has written that the community was founded in 1885 as a few houses and Bud Tate's general store. At the time of its founding, Poteau was in Sugar Loaf County, a part of the Moshulatubbee District of the Choctaw Nation. It was incorporated as a town in the Indian Territory by the federal government on October 8, 1898. The first stone public building, a school, was built in the same year.

The Fort Smith and Southern Railway built a rail line through the Poteau area in 1886–1887, en route to Paris, Texas, including a station within the city. The Poteau post office opened in 1887 and the Kansas City, Pittsburg and Gulf Railroad (acquired by the Kansas City Southern Railway in 1900) began serving the town in 1896.

In 1900, the Federal Court of Indian Territory was moved from Cameron, Oklahoma to Poteau. The Poteau News was first published in 1905. Other modern improvements during the run-up to statehood included: The Bank of Poteau in 1901 (which became a national bank in 1904), and the First Bank of Poteau in 1904.  A telephone company franchise was granted in 1904, and an electric utility and waterworks system was begun in 1906.

After statehood, Governor Charles N. Haskell declared Poteau as a, "... city of the first class."

Geography

The location was a subject of extensive coal mining in the first half of the 20th Century, and a railway, eventually called the Poteau and Cavanal Mountain Railroad, served the mines. The Poteau River is the only river in Oklahoma that flows north. It flows into Arkansas where it meets the Arkansas River at Belle Point in Fort Smith.

Climate 
Poteau is tied with several other towns for the highest recorded temperature in the state of Oklahoma.

Demographics

2020 census

As of the 2020 United States Census, there were 8,807 people, 3,199 households, and 2,224 families residing in the city.

2000 census
As of the census of 2000, there were 7,939 people, 3,013 households, and 2,042 families residing in the city. The racial makeup of the city was 82.14% White, 2.24% African American, 10.00% Native American, 0.38% Asian, 0.03% Pacific Islander, 1.39% from other races, and 3.83% from two or more races. Hispanic or Latino of any race were 5.82% of the population.

There were 3,013 households, out of which 31.6% had children under the age of 18 living with them, 50.0% were married couples living together, 13.3% had a female householder with no husband present, and 32.2% were non-families. 28.3% of all households were made up of individuals, and 14.9% had someone living alone who was 65 years of age or older. The average household size was 2.48 and the average family size was 3.02.

In the city, the population was spread out, with 24.6% under the age of 18, 12.8% from 18 to 24, 26.4% from 25 to 44, 19.9% from 45 to 64, and 16.3% who were 65 years of age or older. The median age was 35 years. For every 100 females, there were 91.0 males. For every 100 females age 18 and over, there were 88.3 males.

The median income for a household in the city was $26,178, and the median income for a family was $31,226. Males had a median income of $24,595 versus $20,625 for females. The per capita income for the city was $15,175. About 19.3% of families and 22.1% of the population were below the poverty line, including 31.8% of those under age 18 and 13.4% of those age 65 or over.

Parks and recreation
Twyman Park offers picnic tables and shelters, a playground, tennis courts, a small pond, and a pool.  Other City facilities include the Poteau Area Recreational Complex for sports events, as well as Bill J. Barber Park and Dunbar Park.

Lake Wister and the Lake Wister State Park are located in Poteau.

Government
Poteau has a mayor-council type of city government, with eight members on the council. The mayor and council members are elected by the citizens to four-year terms. The city Police Department consists of a chief, elected by citizen voters and 12 officers who report to the chief. The city has an all-volunteer fire department, which has a fire chief, an assistant chief, captain and 13 firemen.

Education
The Poteau Public School System includes Poteau Primary School, Poteau Upper Elementary School, Pansy Kidd Middle School and Poteau Senior High School. Pansy Kidd Middle School is named in honor of Pansy Ingle Kidd (1890–1978), who taught in Poteau for over 40 years and was nicknamed the "Dean of Poteau's Teachers."

In 1955, Dr. John Montgomery, a black veterinarian, petitioned the Poteau Public School Board to eliminate the racial segregation of its schools. The board approved his petition, resulting in the integration of the school system and marking Poteau as the first city in Oklahoma to allow African Americans to learn alongside white students in its primary and secondary schools.

Carl Albert State College, formerly known as Poteau Junior College, is one of the 13 state colleges found in Oklahoma.

Kiamichi Technology Center, the largest division of the Oklahoma CareerTech System has a branch location in Poteau.

Infrastructure

Transportation
Poteau is served by US Routes 59, 270, and 271, as well as State Highways 83 and 112.

Robert S. Kerr Airport (KRKR; FAA ID: RKR), about 2 miles south of town, has a 4007’ x 75’ paved runway.

Police
The LeFlore County Sheriff's office is in Poteau, and contains six highway patrol officers and an inspector.

Notable people
 Rilla Askew, writer
 Jackson Burns, actor, writer, producer and stunt coordinator
 Kenneth Corn, former Oklahoma state senator and Oklahoma state representative
 Ron Fortner, radio and television anchor
 Argus Hamilton, comedian and national columnist
 Billy Hoffman, country music singer; raised in Poteau
 Robert S. Kerr, U.S. senator who owned a home and cattle ranch in the Poteau area
 Mick Thompson, current Oklahoma State Banking Commissioner and former Oklahoma State Representative

Notes

References

External links

 
 Poteau Chamber of Commerce

Cities in Le Flore County, Oklahoma
Cities in Oklahoma
County seats in Oklahoma
Fort Smith metropolitan area
Populated places established in 1885
1885 establishments in Indian Territory